Arignar Anna Memorial Cancer Hospital & Research Institute is a state-owned medical college, hospital and research institute in India. It is located in Karapettai, Kancheepuram, Tamil Nadu. It was named after C. N. Annadurai, former Chief Minister of Tamil Nadu. This institution in now a Regional Cancer Centre approved by the Government of India.

References 

Regional Cancer Centres in India
Research institutes in Tamil Nadu
Hospitals in Tamil Nadu
Medical colleges in Tamil Nadu
Universities and colleges in Kanchipuram district
Memorials to C. N. Annadurai
Educational institutions in India with year of establishment missing